Xanthomonas pruni (syn. Xanthomonas campestris pv. pruni, syn. Xanthomonas arboricola pv. pruni) is a bacterial disease of almost all Prunus.

Hosts
Almost all Prunus spp.

Distribution
Unknown in stonefruit in California until detection in Sacramento and northern San Joaquin Valley in the spring of 2013.  it is still restricted to those two areas. Also found in almond cultivation in Victoria, Australia.

Detection
Palacio-Bielsa et al., 2011 provides a SYBR Green I-based assay.

Management
Copper and mancozeb are recommended in California for almonds and have served well elsewhere. No pesticides are registered for almonds anywhere in Australia.

Phage therapy has been heavily studied for X. pruni and some treatments have been very successful. Civerolo & Keil performed several experiments in the 1970s with  showing that peach and apricot were protected by external applications of solution.

Resistance
Resistance to copper has occurred. No copper resistance  in California. Rotation or tank mixing is recommended to forestall resistance.

References

Stone fruit tree diseases
pruni
Bacterial plant pathogens and diseases